{{automatic taxobox
|image = Gymnocladus dioicus Desoto.jpg
|image_caption = Kentucky coffeetree, Gymnocladus dioicus
|taxon = Gymnocladus
|authority = Lam.
|subdivision_ranks = Species
|subdivision = G. angustifolius
G. assamicus
G. burmanicus
G. chinensis
G. dioicus
}}Gymnocladus (Neo-Latin, from Greek γυμνὀς, gymnos, naked + κλάδος, klados, branch) is a small genus of leguminous trees. The common name coffeetree is used for this genus.
DescriptionGymnocladus'' species are  very large, deciduous trees with bipinnate leaves.

The greenish-white flowers only appear after long periods of warm weather. Very long legumes are formed that hang from the branches. The species of this genus are predominantly distributed endochorically.

Species
There are five species:

References

Fabaceae genera
Caesalpinioideae
Taxa named by Jean-Baptiste Lamarck